Bakewell railway station was a railway station built to serve the town of Bakewell in Derbyshire, England, by the Midland Railway on its extension of the Manchester, Buxton, Matlock and Midland Junction Railway line from Rowsley to Buxton.

History
The station was opened by the Midland Railway on 1 August 1862. Being the nearest station to Haddon Hall, it was built in a grand style as the local station for the Duke of Rutland over whose land the line had passed. Designed by Edward Walters of Manchester, the buildings were of fine ashlar with intricate carvings which incorporated the duke's coat of arms.

Since the line was climbing steeply towards its summit at Peak Forest, the station was located uphill about half a mile from the town, which became a disadvantage when road transport developed.

The busiest time was during the Bakewell Show but the station was also popular with campers and tourists. The station was host to an LMS caravan from 1935 to 1939. A camping coach was also positioned here by the London Midland Region from 1954 to 1967.

In the Grouping of all lines (into four main companies) in 1923 the station became part of the London, Midland and Scottish Railway. 
 
During the nationalisation of Britain's railways in 1948 the station was passed on to the London Midland Region of British Railways, and despite escaping the Beeching Axe the station was closed when passenger services ceased on 6 March 1967. Trains continued to pass through the station until 1968 when the line was closed.

Stationmasters

John Tomlinson 1862–1873
Alfred Fewkes 1873–1880 
George R. Gardner 1880–1891 
Albert C. Bilham 1891–1898 (afterwards stationmaster at Matlock Bath)
Thomas Pitt 1898–1901 (formerly stationmaster at Rowsley)
Frank Porter 1901–1907 (formerly stationmaster at Spondon)
Harry l’Anson 1907–1911 (formerly stationmaster at Grindleford, afterwards stationmaster at Matlock)
Harry S. Dawes 1911–1922 (formerly stationmaster at Whatstandwell) 
Ernest Clowes 1922–1932 (formerly stationmaster at Hathern)
E. Miles from 1932

After closure
The station buildings still survive and are Grade II listed. They are perched half a mile east of the centre of Bakewell, high upon the hillside due to the alignment that the railway was forced to take.

In time the station was replaced with Bakewell Industrial Estate; the station building is still in use as a warehouse along with the platforms (but the gap between platforms have been filled in to facilitate the Monsal Trail).

Ridged canopies existed over platform 1, and there was a goods shed and cattle dock, but all have since been removed.

See also
Listed buildings in Bakewell

References

Bibliography

Further reading
 
 
 Station on navigable O.S. map

External links
Flickr
Peak Rail
Station frontage.
Station looking north in 2008

Disused railway stations in Derbyshire
Former Midland Railway stations
Railway stations in Great Britain opened in 1862
Railway stations in Great Britain closed in 1967
1862 establishments in England
Edward Walters railway stations
Grade II listed buildings in Derbyshire
Bakewell